The 1992 Arizona Wildcats softball team represented the University of Arizona in the 1992 NCAA Division I softball season.  The Wildcats were coached by Mike Candrea, who led his seventh season.  The Wildcats finished with a record of 58–7.  They competed in the Pacific-10 Conference, where they finished first with a 16–2 record.

The Wildcats were invited to the 1992 NCAA Division I softball tournament, where they swept the Regional and then completed a run to the title game of the Women's College World Series where they fell to champion UCLA.

Personnel

Roster

Coaches

Schedule

References

Arizona
Arizona Wildcats softball seasons
Arizona Softball
Women's College World Series seasons
Pac-12 Conference softball champion seasons